Doveton Steelers Rugby League Football Club is an Australian rugby league football club based in Doveton, Victoria. They conduct teams for junior, senior and women tag teams. Their inaugural premiership came about in 2007 defeating Altona Roosters 23-22.

Notable Juniors
Following are player that went on to play professional first grade rugby league.
Lloyd Johansson (2005-12 Queensland Reds & Melbourne Rebels)

See also

Rugby league in Victoria

References

External links
Doveton Steelers Fox Sports pulse

Rugby league clubs in Melbourne
Rugby league teams in Victoria (Australia)
Rugby clubs established in 2001
2001 establishments in Australia
Sport in the City of Casey